The Kasplya (Belarusian and ) is a river in Smolensky, Demidovsky, and Rudnyansky Districts of Smolensk Oblast of Russia and in  Vitebsk Region of Belarus, and a major left tributary of the Daugava. It joins the Daugava in the urban-type settlement of Surazh. The town of Demidov is situated on the Kasplya.

The source of the Kasplya is in Lake Kasplya in Smolensky District. It flows north, crosses the border with Demidovsky District and turns northwest. It flows through Demidov, and next to the selo of Boroda turns west, crosses Rudnyansky District and enters Belarus. There, it turns northwest again and enters the Daugava.

During the Viking Age, the river was an important part of the Dnieper trade route, as there was a portage from the Kasplya to the Dnieper tributaries entering the Dnieper near Gnezdovo.

References

Rivers of Vitebsk Region
Portages
Rivers of Smolensk Oblast
International rivers of Europe
Rivers of Belarus